Dama y obrero may refer to:

 Dama y obrero (Chilean TV series)
 Dama y obrero (U.S. TV series)